Tootje Selbach (born 14 March 1928) is a Dutch retired gymnast. She competed in seven events at the 1952 Summer Olympics. Her younger sister Toetie Selbach also competed at the 1952 Summer Olympics.

References

External links
 

1928 births
Possibly living people
Dutch female artistic gymnasts
Olympic gymnasts of the Netherlands
Gymnasts at the 1952 Summer Olympics
Gymnasts from Amsterdam